Shiv Shankar Prasad Chawrasia (born 15 May 1978), commonly known as S.S.P. Chawrasia, is an Indian professional golfer. Since 2008 he has won six Asian Tour events, four of which were co-sanctioned by the European Tour. He has had particular success in the Hero Indian Open where he was runner-up in 1999, 2006, 2013 and 2015 and winner in 2016 and 2017. Nearly all his success has been in India; his only win outside India being the 2016 Resorts World Manila Masters. At the end of the 2014 season he asked the Asian Tour to change the spelling of his last name, previously Chowrasia, to Chawrasia, the spelling that is on his passport.

Early life
Chawrasia's father worked as the greenskeeper at the Royal Calcutta Golf Club in Kolkata, India. It was at this golf course that Chawrasia picked up golf at the age of 10. The self-taught golfer is nicknamed "Chip-putt-sia" because of his short game.

Professional career
Before entering professional golf, he was a caddie for a few years. After entering professional golf in 1997, his earnings at the end of 1998 were $1,220. Chawrasia finished second to Arjun Atwal in the 1999 Indian Open held at the Royal Calcutta Golf Club.

He joined the Asian Tour in 2006 after making steady progress in India with cumulative earnings being $36,983 along with eight Indian Tour titles.

His first season in the Asian Tour had a good opening event in the Pakistan Open, top-20 finishes in Philippine Open and in China. This was followed up with a top-10 finish at Bangkok Airways Open. At the Mercuries Masters in Taiwan, he led the field by five shots at the halfway mark, but was disqualified for forgetting to sign his scorecard. At the 2006 Hero Honda Indian Open, he narrowly missed out on winning the title. The title that won by Jyoti Randhawa, was decided by a play-off. He ended 2006 with a tenth place in Volvo Masters.

After being one stroke behind the leader on the opening day of the 2007 Malaysian Open, he lost ground and ended up finishing tied for 16th at the end of the tournament. His Asian Tour ranking improved from 38 in 2006 to 32 in 2007.

In February 2008, he won the inaugural Indian Masters, which was a part of the 2008 European Tour. The event, which he won with a score of nine under par, earned him £239,705, which doubled his earnings over the past decade. He was the only player to achieve sub-par rounds on all four days in this, the biggest golf event in India. Chawrasia, ranked 388 in the world before the tournament, obtained a two-year exemption on the European Tour. After Jeev Milkha Singh and Arjun Atwal, he became the third Indian golfer to win on the European Tour. Shortly after his victory, not only was he ranked 161 in the Official World Golf Ranking, but also he topped the Asian Tour Order of Merit.

In February 2011, Chawrasia won his second Asian Tour event, the Avantha Masters in New Delhi. Since then he has won the Panasonic Open India in 2014, the Hero Indian Open and the Resorts World Manila Masters in 2016 and the Hero Indian Open for the second time in 2017.

Chawrasia qualified for the 2016 Summer Olympics as the second highest ranked Indian player, representing India along with Anirban Lahiri.

Awards
In August 2017, he was awarded the Arjuna Award by the Ministry of Youth Affairs and Sports, Government of India.

Professional wins (18)

European Tour wins (4)

*Note: The European Tour considers the Avantha Masters to be a continuation of the Emaar-MGF Indian Masters, however the Asian Tour does not share this view.
1Co-sanctioned by the Asian Tour

European Tour playoff record (0–1)

Asian Tour wins (6)

1Co-sanctioned by the European Tour
2Co-sanctioned by the Professional Golf Tour of India

Asian Tour playoff record (2–2)

Professional Golf Tour of India wins (4)

1Co-sanctioned by the Asian Tour

PGA of India Tour wins (9)
2001 Singhania Open
2003 HT Pro Golf, Tata Open, Hero Honda Open, NGC Open
2005 Singhania Open, Tata Open
2006 Singhania Open, Hindu Open

Results in World Golf Championships
Results not in chronological order before 2015.

"T" = Tied
Note that the HSBC Champions did not become a WGC event until 2009.

Team appearances
Professional
EurAsia Cup (representing Asia): 2016, 2018
World Cup (representing India): 2016

See also
2019 European Tour Qualifying School graduates
List of golfers with most Asian Tour wins

References

External links

Indian male golfers
European Tour golfers
Asian Tour golfers
Olympic golfers of India
Golfers at the 2016 Summer Olympics
Golfers from West Bengal
Recipients of the Arjuna Award
1978 births
Living people